Josef Čtyřoký (30 September 1906 in Smíchov — 11 January 1985) was a Czech football player.

Čtyřoký played for SK Slavia Praha (until 1928), SK Kladno (1928–1930) and AC Sparta Prague (1930–1939).

He played for Czechoslovakia national team (42 matches), and was a participant at the 1934 FIFA World Cup, where he played all four matches.

References 
 

1906 births
1985 deaths
Czech footballers
Czechoslovak footballers
1934 FIFA World Cup players
AC Sparta Prague players
SK Slavia Prague players
SK Kladno players
Czechoslovakia international footballers
People from the Kingdom of Bohemia
Association football defenders
Footballers from Prague